The Sands of Time is a children's fantasy novel by Michael Hoeye. The Sands of Time is the second in the Hermux Tantamoq series beginning with Time Stops for No Mouse, followed by No Time Like Show Time, and Time to Smell the Roses. In each one Hermux Tantamoq, mouse, watchmaker, and occasional detective, is the main character.

Plot summary
At the beginning of the story, protagonist Hermux Tantamoq is approached by his father's friend, Birch Tentintrotter, to investigate whether the present-day rodent civilization was preceded, and its technology informed, by a feline civilization now obscured. Following an attempt by antagonist Hinkum Stepfitchler (the son of Birch's mentor) to discredit Birch's thesis, Hermux and pilot Linka Perflinger accompany Birch to the Western desert, where they confirm that the feline civilization existed, and that the rodent population were its slaves. They are thereupon captured by Hinkum Stepfitchler, who reveals that his family made their fortune by plagiarizing the cats' technology. In his subsequent absence, they escape, and expose his plan to the rodent society. Thereafter the ruined feline city is re-created at a rodents' museum, with all its artifacts, at a grand celebration.

External links 
 

2001 American novels
American children's novels
American fantasy novels
Children's fantasy novels
Children's mystery novels
Children's novels about animals
Fictional mice and rats
2001 children's books